Hannah Hoekstra (born August 2, 1987) is a Dutch actress.

Career
In 2010, Hoekstra graduated from the Amsterdam Theatre Academy, where she studied from 2006. During training she participated in the play Underground by director Johan Simons. The following year, she made her debut on TV, playing a small role in the TV series Flikken Maastricht.

Her breakthrough came in 2012 when she was cast in Sacha Polak's film Hemel, in which Hoekstra plays sensual beauty with signs of hypersexuality. The film was shown at the Berlin film festival and received a special prize FIPRESCI. She was also awarded a Golden Calf Award at the Netherlands Film Festival and was nominated for a Rembrandt Award. She was named a recipient of the Shooting Stars Award which was presented by the European Film Promotion board at the 67th Berlin International Film Festival.

Selected appearances

Film

Video games
 Horizon Zero Dawn (2017) as the model for Aloy
 Horizon Forbidden West (2022) as the model for Aloy

References

External links 
 

Living people
1987 births
21st-century Dutch actresses
Dutch film actresses
Dutch television actresses
Golden Calf winners
Place of birth missing (living people)